Anouchka is a given name. Notable people with the name include:

 Anouchka Delon (born 1990), French-Dutch actress
 Anouchka Grose (born 1970),  British-Australian Lacanian psychoanalyst and writer
 Anouchka Martin (born 1993), French swimmer
 Anouchka van Miltenburg (born 1967), retired Dutch politician